Cirrus uncinus is a type of cirrus cloud. The name cirrus uncinus is derived from Latin, meaning "curly hooks". Also known as mares' tails, these clouds are generally sparse in the sky and very thin.

They are generally seen when a warm or occluded front is approaching. They are very high in the troposphere and generally mean that precipitation, usually rain, is approaching.

See also
List of cloud types

References

External links
International Cloud Atlas – Cirrus uncinus

Cirrus